The Industrial Relations Commission of New South Wales conciliates and arbitrates industrial disputes, sets conditions of employment and fixes wages and salaries by making industrial awards, approves enterprise agreements and decides claims of unfair dismissal in New South Wales, a state of Australia.  The Commission was established with effect from 2 September 1996 pursuant to the Industrial Relations Act 1996.

History
Industrial courts have undergone many changes since then depending on the flavour of government in office. In 1908 it was renamed the Industrial Court established under the Industrial Disputes Act 1908. In 1912 it was renamed again, to the Court of Industrial Arbitration (New South Wales) which was established pursuant to the Industrial Arbitration Act 1912. In 1926, the  abolished the Court of Industrial Arbitration and set up another Industrial Commission of New South Wales. In 1991, the Industrial Commission was replaced with the Industrial Relations Commission of New South Wales constituted under the Industrial Relations Act, 1991. In 2016 the Industrial Court was abolished and its powers transferred to the Supreme Court of NSW.

Jurisdiction
Under the Industrial Relations Act 1996, the Commission has the function of setting remuneration and other conditions of employment for employees, resolving industrial disputes, hearing and determining other industrial matters such as claims for unfair dismissal, unfair contract and victimisation.

The Minister for Industrial Relations may refer any matter to the Commission for the Commission to inquiry and report upon.

In exercising its jurisdiction, the Commission must take into account the public interest, the objects of the Industrial Relations Act 1996, and the state of the economy of New South Wales and the likely effect of its decisions on the economy.

The Commission may also sit as a Full Bench for the purposes of hearing Appeals against the decisions of single members, hearing a 'Special Case' or to determine difficult questions referred by a single member to the Full Bench for determination. The Commission also has jurisdiction over certain Police disciplinary matters, while some members hold dual roles on other remuneration tribunals (SOORT) and as dual appointees to the Fair Work Commission.

Composition

The Commission consists of a Chief Commissioner and commissioners appointed by the Governor of New South Wales. A full bench of the Commission contains at least three members.

The current Commission composition is:

See also

List of New South Wales courts and tribunals

References

External links
www.irc.justice.nsw.gov.au Homepage of the Industrial Relations Commission 

New South Wales courts and tribunals
Labour relations organisations in Australia
Labor relations boards
1996 establishments in Australia
Courts and tribunals established in 1996